Silver Lake Township is a township in Worth County, Iowa, USA.

History
Silver Lake Township was established in 1860.

References

Townships in Worth County, Iowa
Townships in Iowa